Jacob Obunga popularly known as Otile Brown is a Kenyan independent R&B singer, songwriter, guitarist and actor. He gained media attention after the release of  his hit single "Imaginary Love" which features Khaligraph Jones. He released his debut studio album, Best of Otile Brown, in April 2017. The album was supported by the singles "Basi", "Alivyonipenda", "Shujaa Wako", "DeJavu" and "Aiyolela". Brown had also collaborated with artists such as Sanaipei Tande, and Barakah The Prince, King Kaka among others.

Early life
Otile was born on March 21, 1994 in Kisumu and raised in Miritini, Mombasa. He is the youngest in a family of four - three brothers and one sister. Otile started singing and writing songs at age 13.

Music career

2017:Best of Otile Brown
Otile's debut album Best of Otile Brown was released in April 2017. The lead single "Imaginary Love" featuring Kenyan rapper, Khaligraph Jones was released on June 3, 2016.  The song was played on several radio stations in Kenya. He parted ways with Dreamland Music label in March 2017 and became an Independent artist.

Since his breakthrough into the Kenyan music industry, Otile has garnered several awards including "Male Video of the Year" at Pulse Music Awards 2018 for his single "Baby Love".

Personal life
Otile is known for his affair with Vera Sidika, a Kenyan Socialite. Their relationship ended in August 2018.

Discography

Album
Best of Otile Brown (2017)

Singles

Just in Love Album

Otile Brown's Just in Love Album officially released on June 3, 2020, proved that Otile is not only the best musician in Kenya, but also the most outstanding R&B artist in East and Central Africa. Otile shared the news with his fans on social media saying the album will be launched on Boomplay. The album has 11 songs with some of them being collaborations with different artistes from Kenya and Tanzania. The album is listed below

Awards
Nominee, Pulse Music Awards, Baby Love "Male Video of the Year" (2018) 
Nominee, HiPipo Music Awards, East Africa Song of The Year -Kenya (2019)

References

21st-century Kenyan male singers
Living people
1994 births